Frea johannae is a species of beetle in the family Cerambycidae. It was described by Gahan in 1890.

Subspecies
 Frea johannae johannae (Gahan, 1890)
 Frea johannae moheliana Breuning, 1957

References

johannae
Beetles described in 1890